Entre caníbales was a 2015 Argentine telenovela, starred by Natalia Oreiro as Ariana, Benjamín Vicuña as El Pibe Larralde and Benjamín Furriel as Valmora. Danny Pardo as Father Martin, Marcelo Melingo as Lemos Arenal and Gerardo Chendo as Julio Castro were the series regulars.

Awards
 2015 Martín Fierro Awards
 Best lead actor of daily fiction (Joaquín Furriel)
 Best lead actress of daily fiction (Natalia Oreiro)

References

Telefe telenovelas
2015 Argentine television series debuts
2015 Argentine television series endings